__notoc__

Max Holland (born 1950, Providence, Rhode Island) is an American journalist, author, and the editor of Washington Decoded, an internet newsletter on US history that began publishing March 11, 2007. He is currently a contributing editor to The Nation and The Wilson Quarterly, and sits on the editorial advisory board of the International Journal of Intelligence and CounterIntelligence. As of 2004 he had more than two decades of journalism experience; his articles have appeared in The Atlantic Monthly, American Heritage, The Washington Post, The New York Times, Los Angeles Times, The Boston Globe, The Baltimore Sun, Studies in Intelligence, the Journal of Cold War Studies, Reviews in American History, and online at History News Network.

Holland's published books include: Leak: Why Mark Felt Became Deep Throat (University Press of Kansas, 2012); The Kennedy Assassination Tapes: The White House Conversations of Lyndon B. Johnson Regarding the Assassination, the Warren Commission, and the Aftermath (Knopf, 2004); The CEO Goes to Washington: Negotiating the Halls of Power (Whittle Direct Books, 1994); and When the Machine Stopped: A Cautionary Tale from Industrial America (Harvard Business School Press, 1989). In 2011, he was the lead consultant for a National Geographic Television documentary about the Kennedy assassination that premiered in November 2011, entitled JFK: The Lost Bullet. The findings of the documentary were summarized in The DeRonja-Holland Report.

In 2001, Holland won the J. Anthony Lukas Work-in-Progress Award, bestowed jointly by Harvard University's Nieman Foundation and the Columbia University School of Journalism, for a forthcoming narrative history of the Warren Commission, to be published by Alfred A. Knopf. That same year he won a Studies in Intelligence Award from the Central Intelligence Agency, the first writer working outside the U.S. government to be so recognized. Holland lives in Washington, DC.

Holland is a 1972 graduate of Antioch College.

Awards and fellowships
 1990 - Fellowship. National Endowment for the Humanities, Washington, D.C.
 1991 - Fellowship. Woodrow Wilson International Center for Scholars, Washington, D.C.
 1998 - Fellowship. John Nicolas Brown Center for the Study of American Civilization, Brown University, Providence, RI.
 2001 - J. Anthony Lukas Work-in-Progress Award. Columbia University School of Journalism and Harvard University Nieman Foundation.
 2001 - Studies in Intelligence Award. Center for the Study of Intelligence, Central Intelligence Agency.
 2004 - Moody Research Grant. Lyndon B. Johnson Foundation, Austin, TX.

Selected publications

Articles
 "Citizen McCloy." The Wilson Quarterly, vol. 15, no. 4 (Autumn 1991), pp. 22–42. . Full issue.
Biography of John J. McCloy.
 "The Lie That Linked CIA to the Kennedy Assassination: The Power of Disinformation." Studies in Intelligence, no. 45, no. 5 (Fall-Winter 2001). Central Intelligence Agency.
 "The 'Photo Gap' that Delayed Discovery of Missiles: Politics and Intelligence." Studies in Intelligence, vol. 49, no. 4 (Sep. 2005), pp. 15-30. Central Intelligence Agency.
 "Private Sources of U.S. Foreign Policy: William Pawley and the 1954 Coup d'État in Guatemala." Journal of Cold War Studies, vol. 7, no. 4 (Oct. 2005), pp. 36-73. The MIT Press. .

Books
 When the Machine Stopped: A Cautionary Tale from Industrial America. Boston, Ma.: Harvard Business School Press (1989). .
 The CEO Goes to Washington: Negotiating the Halls of Power. Knoxville, Tenn.: Whittle Direct Books (1994). .
 From Industry to Alchemy: Burgmaster, A Machine Tool Company. Washington, D.C.: Beard Books (2002). .
 The Kennedy Assassination Tapes: The White House Conversations of Lyndon B. Johnson Regarding the Assassination, the Warren Commission, and the Aftermath. New York: Alfred Knopf (Sep. 2004). .
 Leak: Why Mark Felt Became Deep Throat. Lawrence, Kan.: University Press of Kansas (Mar. 2012). .
 Blind Over Cuba: The Photo Gap and the Missile Crisis. College Station, Tex.: Texas A&M University Press (2012). .

References

Works cited
"Max Holland." Contemporary Authors Online. 2006. Biography Resource Center. Thomson Gale. 25 Sep. 2006 
"Random House: Authors: Max Holland." Random House. 2006. Random House, Inc.. 19 Sep 2006.

External links
 Official website
 Max Holland at IMDb
 Washington Decoded
 

1950 births
Living people
American male journalists
American political writers
Antioch College alumni
Writers from Providence, Rhode Island
The Nation (U.S. magazine) people